Chaplain (Captain) Gary P. Weeden is the command chaplain for United States European Command. He previously served as the 9th Chaplain of the United States Coast Guard. Weeden attended The Western Seminary.

Awards and decorations
Weeden's awards include:

References

Year of birth missing (living people)
Living people
American evangelicals
Chaplains of the United States Coast Guard
Western Seminary alumni